The Awooto Eeday Mosque is a small mosque located in one of the old historical alleyways of Hamar Weyne in Mogadishu.

Overview 
The mosque is said to have been built with the money of a pious woman who was known as Awooto Eeday (Awooto which means grandmother in the local dialect). Above the mihrab of this mosque there's a plate with inscriptions which bears the date of 1223 AH, which corresponds to 1845 on the Gregorian calendar, according to Prof. Sharif Abdalla. However, according Maria Roasrio La Lomia, the mosque could be a lot older and that date could reflect the renovation of an older mosque.  Awooto Eeday ("Grandmother Eeday‟) mosque is the neighbourhood mosque for the Shanshiyo. It was here that Sheikh Abba spent much of his day in the last quarter century, for prayer, teaching his students, and talking with people. According to his son 'Abdirahman, the mosque was built by an old woman of the Reer Sheikh Muumin, and is on the site of yet an older mosque.

See also 

 Jama'a Shingani, Shingani
 Fakr ad-Din Mosque
 Arba'a Rukun Mosque
 Jama'a Xamar Weyne, Xamar Weyne
 'Adayga Mosque
 Mohamed Al Tani

References

Mosques in Somalia
Buildings and structures in Mogadishu